Araújo or Araujo or Araúxo is a surname Galician of noble medieval origin. Possibly the noble Don Rodrigo Anes de Araujo, lord of the Araujo castle, Ourense, Galicia, was the first to use the surname of Araújo. His great-grandson Pedro Anes de Araújo moved to the kingdom of Portugal, around 1375, being the first Araújo to settle there.

History 
The progenitor of Araújo's surname is probably Don Rodrigo Annes, who was the Lord of the Castle and the lands of Araújo, located in the south of the Kingdom of Galicia, in the current province of  Ourense. That castle was on the border between the Kingdom of Galicia and the north of Portugal. Some point to the knight Vasco de Araujo, as the first to use that surname as a nickname.

According to various historians, Don Rodrigo Annes de Araújo was descended from members of the royal families of the kingdom of France and the kingdom of Burgundy through a noble French knight named Iohannes Tirante, also known as "Jean Tyranothe". This French knight, along with a large number of knights from France and Burgundy, participated in the battles of the Reconquista, helping to expel the Moors and defend the kingdom. Reconquered lands were donated to the knights who participated in the battles, as well as other royal privileges.

The existence of this knight is verified throughout the acts of royal privileges granted by the king Alfonso VII of Leon, and his son, where it is possible to see the name Iohannes Tirante among the nobles who received royal privileges. His name also appears in a scroll dated 1139, in which he is mentioned together with other nobles involved in the reconstruction of a church in the south of Galicia. Iohannes Tirante would be the son of a Galician nobleman named Fernando Annes, with a French woman of noble origin, a descendant of the royal houses of France and Borgoña, probably one of the daughters or granddaughters of king Philip I of France, or of Duchess Hidegard of Burgundy. He moved to Galicia after 1128, to help his father who was one of the most powerful men in that kingdom. In this period, in addition to fighting the Moors, He would help King Afonso VII of León defend Galician interests against Prince Afonso Henriques, who was trying to proclaim himself king of Portugal. At the time, Portugal was a county linked to the Kingdom of Galicia.

According to Alexandre Herculano, in the year 1139, Fernando Annes - who was known by the title Princeps Limiae for being governor in the south of Galicia - would defend the lands of Galicia against the attacks of Afonso Henriques. That fits perfectly with what the chroniclers say, because Iohannes Tirante would fight in this battle, in which he, his father, relatives and friends would defeat Afonso Henriques.

After some time in Galicia, Iohannes Tirante married a woman named Mayor Garces de Asa, daughter of Count Don Garcia de Asa. Asa's family was at that time one of the most powerful in the kingdom, descendants of one of the Infantes of the kingdom of León, which helps to explain the origins of the Araújo family in Asa's house, as some genealogists maintain. From the marriage with Dona Mayor Garces de Asa, Iohannes Tirante had at least one son, named Xoán Annes, who was Captain of Arms in the reign of Afonso VII. This Xoán Annes would also be the ancestor of Rodrigo Anes, lord of the castle of Araújo.

Later, in 1492, the Kingdom of Galicia along with other Kingdoms in the Iberian peninsula were united to become the Kingdom of Spain. Throughout Spain's colonial period between the 16th and 19th century a number of Galician Spaniards bearing the surname Araújo in the service of the King of Spain moved to colonize the territories of the Spanish Empire in North America and South America.

Throughout Portugal's colonial period a number of Portuguese bearing the Araújo surname moved to settle Portugal's overseas empire.

A lot of things have been named after the Araujo surname, such as lands; neighborhoods, streets, valleys, buildings, businesses, a plant, etc.

Tributes 
The bishop of Malaca, D. João Ribeiro Gaio, dedicated this quintilla to the Araújos:

Across the Bitorinho
in the land watered by the Miño River
there are now-worn graves of
famous Araújos,
ancient and magnified.

Notable people with the surname

Church
 Antonio de Araujo (d. 1632), Brazilian Jesuit missionary 
 Eugênio de Araújo Sales (1920-2012), cardinal in the Roman Catholic Church
 Heitor de Araújo Sales, Eugênio's brother. Archbishop of Natal, Brazil.
 Serafim Fernandes de Araújo (1924–2019), cardinal archbishop of Belo Horizonte, Brazil

Arts and humanities
 Francisco Correa de Araujo (1584-1654) Spanish renaissance organist, composer, and theorist.
 Emanoel Araújo taught and directed in many important institutions, such as Pinacoteca do Estado de São Paulo.
 Orestes Araújo (1853-1915), Uruguayan scholar
 Emanuel Araújo (1942–2000), history professor
 Cândido José de Araújo Viana (1793-1875), Brazilian writer
 Norberto de Araújo (1889—1952), Portuguese writer, journalist, and geographer of Lisbon
 César Calvo de Araujo (1910-1970), Peruvian writer and painter
 Cristiano Araújo (1986–2015), was a Brazilian sertanejo singer and songwriter
 Juan de Araujo (1646-1712), Spanish-Peruvian Musician
 Loipa Araújo (born 1943), Cuban prima ballerina
 Manuel de Araújo Porto-alegre, Baron of Santo Ângelo (1806-1876), Brazilian poet and playwright
 Nelson de Araújo (1926-1993), renowned author
 Taís Araújo (born 1978), Brazilian actress
 Sonia Araujo (born 1970), Portuguese TV presenter
 Kate DeAraugo (born 1985), Australian singer
 Arturo Araujo (born 1967), Colombian Artist
 Heriberto Araújo (born 1983), Spanish journalist and writer
 Mia Araujo (born 1986), Argentine-American painter

Science and technology
 Carlos Paz de Araujo  is a Brazilian American scientist and inventor with nearly 600 patents registered in his name. Most of them are associated with nanotechnology, particularly a ferroelectric memory chip (FeRAM).
 Antonio Eusebio Lazcano Araujo Reyes Mexican biology researcher, focus on emergence of life. Former NASA Astrobiology Institute member.
 Carolina Araujo (mathematician) developed techniques related to Japanese mathematician Shigefumi Mori's proposed theory of rational curves of minimal degree.
 Jorge Quina Ribeiro de Araújo (born 1941), Portuguese biologist and three times rector of the University of Évora
 Miguel Bastos Araújo (born 1969), Portuguese scientist
 Carlos Ernesto Araujo (born 1968), pulmonologist
 Heráclides César de Souza Araújo Brazilian scientist known for his research into the control and treatment of leprosy.
 António de Araújo e Azevedo, 1st Count of Barca Amateur Botanist. Plant Araujia named after him.

Politicians
 Aliança de Araújo (born ), East Timorese politician
 Álvaro Araújo Castro (born 1967), Colombian politician
 Arturo Araujo, president of El Salvador
 Consuelo Araújo (1940-2001), Colombian politician, writer and self-taught journalist
 Fernando Araújo Perdomo (born ), Minister of Development of Colombia
 Fernando de Araújo (born 1962), East Timorese politician
 Hernando Molina Araújo (born 1961), Colombian politician
 João Augusto de Araújo Castro, Brazilian diplomat and minister
 João Batista Oliveira de Araujo, Brazilian politician
 Luís Araújo (born 1949), Chief of Staff of the Portuguese Air Force
 Manuel Enrique Araujo (1865-1913), President of El Salvador
 María Consuelo Araújo (born 1971), Colombian politician
 Mariano de Araújo Matsinhe (born 1953), Mozambican politician
 Nelson Araujo (born 1987), American politician
 Theolinda Olympio de Araújo, Brazilian politician
 José Sarney de Araújo Costa, Brazilian President
 Joaquim Aurélio Barreto Nabuco de Araújo (August 19, 1849 – January 17, 1910) was a Brazilian writer, statesman
 Pedro de Araújo Lima, Marquis of Olinda (22 December 1793 – 7 June 1870), politician and monarchist of the Empire of Brazil
 Manuel de Araújo, Mozambican politician

Sportspeople
 Napoleon Araújo Doffigny (born 1929), South American pole-vaulting champion, Bolivian national fencing, track and football champion
 George Araujo (1931 - 1997), American boxer
 Eronilde de Araújo (born 1970), Brazilian athlete
 Marcelo Araujo, Argentine sports journalist
 Márcio Araújo (born 1973), beach volleyball player
 Mário de Araújo Cabral (1934–2020), former racing driver
 Rafael Paulo de Lara Araújo (born 1980), Brazilian professional basketball player
 Armindo Araujo (born 1977), Portuguese rally driver
 Pedro Araújo (born 1993), Dominican professional baseball pitcher

Footballers
 Araújo (footballer, born 1998), Brazilian footballer
 Alcides Araújo Alves (born 1985), Brazilian footballer
 Carlos Luciano Araujo (born 1981), Argentinian defender
 Clemerson de Araújo Soares (born 1977), Brazilian footballer
 Denílson de Oliveira Araújo (born 1977), football winger
 Gustavo Lazzaretti de Araújo (born 1984), Brazilian central defender
 Ilan Araujo Dall'Igna (born 1980), Brazilian football forward
 José Carlos da Costa Araújo (born 1962), Brazilian football goalkeeper
 Joubert Araújo Martins (born 1975), Brazilian association football player
 Leonardo Araújo (born 1969), football midfielder
 Márcio Rodrigues Araújo (born 1984), Brazilian defensive midfielder
 Marcos Gomes de Araujo (born 1976), Brazilian striker
 Néstor Araujo (born 1991), Mexican footballer
 Oélilton Araújo dos Santos (born 1981), Brazilian-born Croatian footballer
 Patricio Araujo (born 1988), Mexican footballer
 Paulo Araujo Jr. (born 1989), Brazilian striker
 Raffael Caetano de Araújo (born 1985), footballer
 Reginaldo Araújo (born 1977), Brazilian defender
 Ricardo Martins de Araújo (born 1986), Brazilian footballer
 Ronald Araújo (born 1999), Uruguayan football defender
 Ronny Heberson Furtado de Araújo (born 1986), Brazilian football defender
 Saulo Araújo Fontes (born 1989), Brazilian goalkeeper
 Sérgio Araújo (born 1963), Brazilian winger
 Sergio Araujo (born 1992), Argentine striker
 Telmario de Araújo Sacramento (born 1983), Brazilian striker
 Thiago Luiz Moreira de Araújo (born 1988), Brazilian full back
 Vinícius Vasconcelos Araújo (born 1993), Brazilian striker

Fictional
 Araújo family, Portuguese Americans in the film Mystic Pizza
 Leleco Araújo, Brazil Avenue
 Nicolas Araujo, Alice
 Alvarez Araujo, Deus Ex: The Fall
 Ivone Araújo, Girls from Ipanema
 Jorge Araujo, Lady of still
 Miguel Araujo, The Art of More
 Fernando Araujo, The Heist of the Century
 Miguel Araujo, A Herdeira
 Reina Carolina Araujo Cabrales, House of Queens
 Eduardo Araujo, Culprit
 Nicolas Araujo, Lady of Still
 Jorge Tufao Araújo, Brazil Avenue
 Lana de Araujo Goes, Vamp

Bibliography 
 ARMORIAL LUSITANO, Editorial Enciclopédia Ltda., Lisboa, 1961, Prof. Afonso Eduardo Martins Zuquete.

References

Galician-language surnames
Portuguese-language surnames